FC Twente in European football includes the games which are played by FC Twente in competitions organised by UEFA.

Totals

Top scorers

Competitions by Countries

Results

(1969–1970)

1969-70 season

1970-71 season

(1971–1980)

1972-73 season

1973-74 season

1974-75 season

3–3 on aggregate, Twente won on away goals rule.

Twente won 3–1 on aggregate.

Twente won 6–3 on aggregate.

Twente won 2–1 on aggregate.

Twente won 4–1 on aggregate.

Borussia Mönchengladbach won 5–1 on aggregate.

1977-78 season

FC Twente won 3–0 on aggregate.

FC Twente won 4–1 on aggregate.

FC Twente won 7–0 on aggregate.

Anderlecht won 3–0 on aggregate.

1978-79 season

Manchester City won 4–3 on aggregate.

1979-80 season

Panionios won 5–3 on aggregate.

(1981–1990)

1980-81 season

Twente won 5–3 on aggregate.

1–1 on aggregate; Dynamo Dresden won on away goals

1983-84 season

1985-86 season

1989-90 season

Club Brugge won 4–1 on aggregate.

(1991–2000)

1990-91 season

Bayer Leverkusen won 2–1 on aggregate.

1993-94 season

Bayern Munich won 7–3 on aggregate.

1994-95 season

Kispesti Honvéd won 5–4 on aggregate.

1997-98 season

2–2 on aggregate; Twente won on away goals.

1–1 on aggregate; Twente won on away goals.

Auxerre won 3–0 on aggregate.

1998-99 season

FC Twente won 2–0 on aggregate.

Austria Salzburg won 5–3 on aggregate.

(2001–2010)

2001-02 season

FC Twente won 4–1 on aggregate.

Grasshoppers won 6–4 on aggregate.

2006-07 season

Twente won 3–2 on aggregate.

FCI Levadia Tallinn won 2–1 on aggregate.

2007-08 season

3–3 on aggregate; Getafe CF won on away goals.

2008-09 season

Arsenal F.C. won 6–0 on aggregate.

Rennes 2–2 Twente on aggregate. Twente won on away goals.

---

Marseille 1–1 Twente on aggregate. Marseille won 7–6 on penalties.

2009-10 season

1–1 on aggregate; Sporting CP won on away goals.

Twente won 3–1 on aggregate.

Werder Bremen won 4–2 on aggregate.

(2011–2020)

2010-11 season

Twente won 4–2 on aggregate.

Twente won 3–2 on aggregate.

Villarreal won 8–2 on aggregate.

2011-12 season

Twente won 2–0 on aggregate.

Benfica won 5–3 on aggregate.

Twente won 2–0 on aggregate.

Schalke 04 won 4–2 on aggregate.

2012-13 season

Twente won 9–0 on aggregate.

Twente won 6–1 on aggregate.

Twente won 4–0 on aggregate.

2014-15 season

1–1 on aggregate. Qarabağ won on away goals.

Notes

References

External links
 FC Twente in www.uefa.com
 Official web site of FC Twente

Dutch football clubs in international competitions
FC Twente